Neil Smit (born 1960) is an American businessman and former CEO of Comcast Cable, an American corporation providing cable, entertainment, and communications products and services.

Collegiate education and military service
Smit earned a Bachelor of Science in oceanography & geology from Duke University and then achieved a Masters of Science Degree from Tufts University's Fletcher School of Law and Diplomacy in international business. Smit served in the United States Navy, serving for five years as a member on the SEALs team and was honorably discharged from the United States Navy at the commissioned officer rank of lieutenant commander. Smit is married and he and his wife have two sons, though he keeps his personal life very private.

Career and other business activities
Smit was CEO of Comcast Corporation Cable until 2017. In a statement, Smit cited "injuries" he sustained from his previous career as reasons why he's changing positions. But also approaching 60, he said he's looking forward to spending more time with his family.  His reported annual compensation was $19,856,203, which places him among the top 200 highest paid CEOs in America. After that, Smit joined Comcast in March 2010 from Charter Communications where he served as Chief Executive Officer and Director since 2005. Prior to joining Charter, he was the President of Time Warner's America Online Access Business, where he oversaw Internet access services, including America Online (AOL), CompuServe and Netscape ISPs. He also served at AOL as Executive Vice President, Member Services, and Chief Operating Officer of MapQuest. Neil also was a regional president with Nabisco and served in a number of management positions at Pillsbury.

Smit served as the chairman of CableLabs, the research and development consortium for the cable industry, and as chairman of the board of directors of the National Cable & Telecommunications Association (NCTA). He also serves on the board of directors for C-SPAN.

He joined the Board of Directors at Quant Network in July 2020.

Community relations
Smit has remained actively engaged with the veteran community and has led Comcast's commitment to hire at least 10,000 veterans from 2015 to 2017.

References

External links 
 Neil Smit 2018 Cable Hall of Fame, Youtube, 3 min 16 sec

1960 births
Living people
American chief executives
American corporate directors
American media executives
Comcast people
Duke University alumni
American billionaires
United States Navy SEALs personnel
The Fletcher School at Tufts University alumni
Place of birth missing (living people)
Businesspeople from Philadelphia
20th-century American businesspeople